Müteferrika Süleyman Ağa, known as Suleiman Aga and Soleiman Agha in France, was an Ottoman Empire ambassador to the French king Louis XIV in 1669. Suleiman visited Versailles, but only wore a simple wool coat and refused to bow to Louis XIV, who immediately banished him to Paris, away from Versailles.

In Paris, Suleiman set up a beautiful house where he was credited for introducing coffee drinking to the Parisian society, with waiters dressed in Ottoman style, triggering enthusiastic responses thereby starting the fashion for coffee-drinking. Suleiman invited Parisian society women to his home for extravagant "coffee ceremonies", which were imitated throughout Parisian high society.

Suleiman's activities in Paris were a trigger for the popularity of Turquerie and Orientalism in early modern France, in which Turkish fashions of the time such as turbans and caftans and decorations such as carpets and cushions became highly popular.

The first French coffee shop, the Café Procope, opened in 1689, just 17 years after Suleiman's famed visit.

See also
 Franco-Ottoman alliance
 Charles Marie François Olier, marquis de Nointel
 Le Bourgeois gentilhomme

Notes

References

Bernstein, W. A splendid exchange: how trade shaped the world Atlantic Monthly Press, 2008

External links
The Embassy of Soliman Aga to Louis XIV: Diplomacy, Dress, and Diamonds, by Garritt van Dyk

Ambassadors of the Ottoman Empire to France
17th-century diplomats
17th-century people from the Ottoman Empire